He means the clastics of wheat or rice originally and generally refers to coarse cereals. In China, it is a specifically traditional pastry in the west area of Guangdong province. In traditional festivals such as Spring festival)( also called Chinese New Year) Spirit festival (July 14) and winter solstice, and wedding. ceremony, birthday feast and housewarming party, 籺(hé) is an inevitable pastry in the west area of Guangdong province, especially in Maoming City, Guangdong Province. People regard 籺(hé) as a symbol of jubilance and share them with their relatives and friends, which can truly strengthen kinship and friendship.

Meaning of 籺(hé)

Basic meaning 
The clastics of wheat or rice, usually used for coarse grain 
In general, it always refers to grain of rice and wheat

Input method

Origin 

It is believed that people in Gaozhou County, Maoming City, Guangdong Province firstly made the 籺(hé) and kept ongoing reshaping. 
Long ago, Gaozhou County was a wasteland grown with weeds. A war broken out, a group of refugees made their way there and decided to live there. At the beginning, the first-generation settlers here could only plant tuber crops and other coarse cereals (e.g. maize, sorghum, millet, etc. ) because of the barren land. In order to make good use of the crops, settlers used mallet to pound the grain into flour, and then the flour was mixed with water and cooked with the purpose of increasing overall size.  This is the fundamental method of making  籺(hé)  a smooth paste.

Afterward, people successfully planted rice and gained harvest. To celebrate the harvest, or, to a certain degree, to improve their life, they followed the basic method to pound the rice into flour, and add the vegetables filling inside, and knead them into a specific shape. This was the original 籺(hé).

Also, they used the polished round-grained rice flour to make 籺(hé) but found glutinous rice flour was more suitable to make 籺(hé)  with its strengthening viscosity and taste. From then on, people gradually made 籺(hé) with glutinous rice flour. Glutinous rice flour “he” gained widespread popularity in the west area of Guangdong province and became a shared custom.

Stuffing

The stuffing of 籺(hé)can be various according to everyone's taste and flavor. Yet, in general, the stuffing is mainly divided into two type: sweet stuffing and salty stuffing.

Sweeting stuffing 
Mainly contain sesame, peanut, desiccated coconut, lotus root, etc.

Salty stuffing 
Mainly contains green bean, peanut, bacon, shrimps, etc.

Dressing and sauces(调料和酱料) 
 Dressing and sauces are also significant in the process of making 籺(hé). Roughly, in West area of Guangdong Province, people tend to use ginger, peanut oil, soy sauce and other traditional seasoner.

Making process
Taking salty peach-shaped 籺(hé) for instance

 Preparing related material: glutinous rice flour, clean jackfruit leaves, skinless green bean, peach-shaped mould
  Making stuffing: put shrimps into fried oil, and fry green beans, blend all the ingredients together and stir evenly
 Boiling proportional water in a pot, pouring moderate glutinous rice flour, stirring evening until cooking thoroughly. Mixing the cooked flour with the raw flour and  kneading well until it is not enough hand-sticky 
  Shaping the kneaded dough into ball and adding stuffing into it 
  Putting stuffed ball into the mould to become peach-shaped 籺(hé)
  Using jackfruit leaves to separate shaped 籺(hé) and then stewing for half an hour
  Dotting red color in the surface of 籺(hé)  which stand for jubilance and celebration

Related Folklore of 籺(hé)

Peach-shaped 籺(hé) 

During the Tang Dynasty(618-907AD), one day, the Nanshan god of longevity passed by Gaozhou County and accommodated 
himself to a courier hostel. At the midnight, he heard a woman next door bursting into crying. He was so curious that he asked
for information from the crying woman. He learned that the woman was an impoverished widow and completely bound by her parents-in-law. 
Yet, her parents-in-law were seriously ill and she decided to go to the seek longevity herb to save her parents-in-law's 
life. The god was deeply moved by the woman's filial behaviors and took two rice balls out and gave them to the woman. 
The woman brought them home and made them into peach-shaped 籺(hé). After eating the 籺(hé), her 
parents-in-law were recovered. From then on, this kind of 籺(hé) represented longevity and ecstasy and gained growing popularity.

References

External links
 Chinese Dictionary

Chinese cuisine
Rice cakes
Cantonese cuisine
Chinese pastries